William Francis Casey (2 May 1884 – 20 April 1957) was a journalist and newspaper editor, notably spending most of his working life employed by British newspaper, The Times. He first took employment as a sub-editor shortly before World War I, remaining with the paper until 1952. He was educated at Castleknock College and Trinity College Dublin.

References

1884 births
1957 deaths
Alumni of Trinity College Dublin
British newspaper editors
The Times people
People educated at Castleknock College
Emigrants from Cape Colony to the United Kingdom